Albert Nobbs is a 2011 period drama film directed by Rodrigo García and starring Glenn Close. The screenplay, by Close, John Banville and Gabriella Prekop, is based on the 1927 novella Albert Nobbs by George Moore.

The film received mixed reviews, but the performances of Close and Janet McTeer were praised; they were nominated for the Academy Award in the categories of Best Actress and Best Supporting Actress, respectively. They also received Golden Globe Award and Screen Actors Guild Award nominations. The film was also nominated for the Academy Award for Best Makeup.

The novella had been earlier adapted as a play entitled The Singular Life of Albert Nobbs in which Close starred Off-Broadway in 1982 and for which she won an Obie Award for Best Actress.

Plot

Albert Nobbs is a butler at the Morrison Hotel in late-19th-century Dublin, Ireland; his boss is Mrs. Baker. Although born female, Albert has spent the last 30 years living as a man. He has also been secretly saving money to buy a tobacconist shop to gain some measure of freedom and independence.

Recently unemployed Joe Mackins arrives at the hotel and cons his way into a boilerman job. He and a maid there, Helen Dawes, become lovers. Hubert Page, tasked with painting at the hotel, discovers Albert's secret. He reveals to Albert that he is keeping the same secret about himself, living as a man after escaping an abusive husband.

Albert visits Hubert at his home and meets Cathleen, Hubert's wife. Albert tells Hubert the story of his life: born illegitimate and then abandoned, Albert was adopted by a Mrs. Nobbs and educated in a convent before being expelled after his mother died. One night, aged 14 and still living as a girl, Albert was brutally gang-raped and beaten by a group of men. After hearing there was a need for waiters, Albert bought a suit, was interviewed and hired, and began his life with a male identity.

Believing Helen may be the ideal wife to run a shop with, Albert asks her out on a date. She refuses, but Joe, believing that Albert will give Helen money that could help the pair emigrate to America, encourages her to lead Albert on. She agrees to this approach, allowing Albert to buy her gifts. Helen is uncomfortable with Albert and the arrangement that Joe has persuaded her to make. Albert also tells Helen about his plan to buy a shop.

Helen eventually discovers she is pregnant with Joe's child. Joe is terrified, fearing he will become like his abusive father. Meanwhile, Albert goes to Hubert's home one day and learns that Cathleen has died, leaving Hubert devastated. Albert and Hubert put on dresses made by Cathleen. Though both at first are extremely uncomfortable, they eventually spend a fun day together dressed as women. A stumble and fall by Albert on the beach brings them back to reality. The pair return to Hubert's, change back into their men's clothing, and go back to their lives as before.

Back at the hotel, Albert learns Helen is pregnant and offers to marry her. She refuses, saying Albert does not love her, though Albert voices a fear that Joe will leave by himself for America and not take her and the child. Later that evening, Joe and Helen get into a loud fight after Joe reveals he is indeed going to America alone. Albert attacks Joe when he gets physical with Helen, and Joe throws Albert against a wall, giving him a head injury. Albert retires to bed, forgotten in the commotion, bleeding from one ear. Helen angrily tells Joe she no longer wants to be with him anyway, and he leaves. Helen finds Albert dead in his bed the next morning.

Helen eventually gives birth to a son, Albert Joseph. It's implied Mrs. Baker found Albert's savings, and hires Hubert again to make improvements to the hotel. When Helen sees Hubert, she breaks down and reveals she earns nothing working for Mrs. Baker, but if she objects she will be separated from her son and thrown out into the street. Hubert looks knowingly at her and says, "We can't let that happen, can we?"

Cast

Production

Close first played the titular character in a 1982 stage production and spent 15 years trying to turn it into a film. The film almost went into production in the early 2000s, with director István Szabó, but the financing fell through. In addition to her starring role, Close is also a producer and co-writer with John Banville.

Production was scheduled to begin in July 2010 but was delayed until December, when Mia Wasikowska and Aaron Johnson replaced Amanda Seyfried and Orlando Bloom. Filming commenced on 13 December on location in Dublin and Wicklow. In July 2011, it was announced that Albert Nobbs would screen at the 2011 Toronto International Film Festival in September and the first official photos from the film were released.

Reception
 
The film received mixed reviews from critics. Rotten Tomatoes gave it a rating of 56%, based on 158 reviews, with an average rating of 6.01/10. The site's consensus reads, "Albert Nobbs tells a worthy story with an outstanding performance at its core, even if the end result is often somewhat less than the sum of its admirable parts". Metacritic gave the film a 57 out of 100, with mixed or average reviews based on reviews from 42 critics.

Release
In the United States, the film had a limited release in December 2011, and opened at 245 locations in January 2012. The film grossed a worldwide total of $5,634,828.

Accolades

References

External links
 
 
 
 A Story-Teller's Holiday by George Moore, 1918. Chapters 45 through 53 contain the story later reprinted in Celibate Lives as "The Singular Life of Albert Nobbs".

2010s English-language films
2010s American films
2010s British films
2010s historical drama films
2010s feminist films
2011 films
2011 drama films
2011 LGBT-related films
British historical drama films
British LGBT-related films
Lesbian-related films
Cross-dressing in British films
English-language Irish films
English-language French films
Films based on Irish novels
Films directed by Rodrigo García
Films produced by Bonnie Curtis
Films set in Dublin (city)
Films shot in Dublin (city)
Films set in the 19th century
Films with screenplays by John Banville
Irish drama films
Irish LGBT-related films
LGBT-related drama films
Lionsgate films
Roadside Attractions films
Irish Film Board films
Canal+ films
Films set in hotels
British feminist films
American LGBT-related films
Cross-dressing in American films
American historical drama films